The Silver Anniversary Edition 24 Hour Pepsi Challenge was a 24-hour endurance sports car race held on February 5–6, 1983 at the Daytona International Speedway road course. The race served as the opening round of the 1983 IMSA GT Championship.

Victory overall and in the GTP class went to the No. 6 Henn's Swap Shop Racing Porsche 935 driven by Bob Wollek, Claude Ballot-Léna, Preston Henn, and A. J. Foyt. Victory in the GTO class went to the No. 7 Racing Beat Mazda RX-7 driven by Pete Halsmer, Bob Reed, and Rick Knoop. Victory in the GTU class went to the No. 92 Kent Racing Mazda RX-7 driven by Lee Mueller, Hugh McDonough, and Terry Visger.

Race results
Class winners in bold.

References

24 Hours of Daytona
1983 in sports in Florida
1983 in American motorsport